Robert Allan "Bud" Smith (born October 23, 1979) is an American retired baseball pitcher. Smith was active at the major league level in 2001 and 2002, playing for the St. Louis Cardinals.

Minor leagues
In 2000, Smith led the minor league Cardinal organization with a 2.26 ERA (among starters) and 17 wins (5 with AAA Memphis and 12 with AA Arkansas) and threw two no-hitters of the seven-inning variety against Midland and San Antonio.  His 2000-year performance earned him Baseball Weekly's Minor League Pitcher of the Year award.

No-hitter and major league career 

Smith's major league career was short but notable, as he became the 18th rookie since 1900 to throw a no-hitter. Smith's Cardinals defeated the San Diego Padres 4–0 on September 3, 2001, with the rookie hurler giving up four walks but no hits, while throwing 134 pitches in the game. Due to Smith's high pitch count entering the later innings, Cardinal pitching coach Dave Duncan was actually hoping someone would break up the no-hitter, fearing that his young pitcher might tire, although he went against that judgment in allowing Smith to finish the game. , Smith's is the most recent no-hitter by a Cardinals' pitcher.

Smith had an impressive rookie season in 2001, compiling a 6–3 record and 3.83 earned run average in 16 games, good for fourth in Rookie of the Year voting. However, after posting a dreadful 6.94 era in his sophomore season, he never pitched at the major league level again.

Smith has the distinction of being the last member of the Cardinals to wear the number 51. In his major league debut, he donned the number associated with retired fan favorite Willie McGee, upsetting many fans. Shortly thereafter, Smith agreed to change his number to 52 and no one has used 51 since.

For his career, Smith was 7–8 with a 4.95 earned run average in 132.7 innings. He made 27 appearances with 24 starts, with the no-hitter being his only complete game shutout. 

On July 29, 2002, he was traded to the Philadelphia Phillies along with infielder Plácido Polanco and relief pitcher Mike Timlin for third baseman Scott Rolen, relief pitcher Doug Nickle and cash. Smith never made a major league appearance for the Phillies, and on October 15, 2004, was granted free agency. He later signed with the Minnesota Twins on December 14, 2004.

Post-major league career 
Smith was most recently a member of the Long Beach Armada of the independent Golden Baseball League in  until retiring from baseball.

See also

 List of Major League Baseball no-hitters

References

External links

Rookie Smith pitches improbable no-hitter

1979 births
Living people
Baseball players from Torrance, California
Long Beach Armada players
Los Angeles Harbor Seahawks baseball players
Major League Baseball pitchers
St. Louis Cardinals players
Toronto Blue Jays scouts